The L.H. Ford Bridge is a concrete balanced cantilever bridge that carries the Mitchell Highway over the Macquarie River in Dubbo, New South Wales. It was officially open to traffic by the Minister for Local Government and Minister for Highways, Pat Morton on 26 September 1969 and named in honour of the former Mayor of Dubbo and Member of the New South Wales Parliament for Dubbo, Les Ford. Work commended in 2018 to strengthen and extend the life of the bridge, with the project completed in 2020.

History and condition
Since its opening, the centre span of the bridge had significantly sagged, reducing the lifespan, causing a noticeable dip and increased maintenance costs. In November 2018 work commenced on strengthening the centre span of the bridge with the construction of two piers in the river to support the centre span and each end of the cantilever fitted with external post tensioning cables, extending the life of the bridge and to allow for heavy vehicles up to 68 tonnes, which was completed in 2020.

References

External links

Bridges completed in 1969
Bridges in New South Wales
Dubbo
1969 establishments in Australia